Leon Bibb (February 7, 1922 – October 23, 2015) was an American-Canadian folk singer and actor who grew up in Kentucky, studied voice in New York City, and worked on Broadway. His career began when he became a featured soloist of the Louisville Municipal College glee club as a student.  He lived in Vancouver, British Columbia, Canada, after 1969.

Bibb was born in Louisville, Kentucky and was one of the performers at the first Newport Folk Festival in 1959. He also had his own NBC television talk show. During the late-1950s and early-1960s, Bibb was one of a number of American entertainers, such as his good friend Paul Robeson, who were blacklisted for alleged ties to left-wing groups and causes. In 1963, Bibb traveled to Mississippi to join Dick Gregory and others in the fight against racial segregation in the United States.

Despite that setback, Bibb continued to perform, and around 1963–64 he was featured singing on the national TV show, Hootenanny, on The Ed Sullivan Show and performed with Bill Cosby on tours. He also provided the soundtrack to Luis Buñuel's 1960 film The Young One. His a cappella vocals blend his classical, spiritual and blues influences.

In 2009, he was made a Member of the Order of British Columbia. At the time of receiving this honor, Bibb was still an active performer.

He died on October 23, 2015.   He is the father of the New York-based acoustic blues singer/songwriter Eric Bibb, and grandfather of Swedish dancer and performer Rennie Mirro.

Discography

Studio albums

 Leon Bibb Sings Folk Songs (Vanguard, 1959)
 Tol' My Captain (Vanguard, 1960)
 Leon Bibb Sings Love Songs (Vanguard, 1960)
 Leon Bibb Sings (Columbia, 1961)
 Oh Freedom and Other Spirituals (Washington, 1962)
 Cherries & Plums (Liberty, 1964)
 The Now Composers (Phillips, 1967)
 Foment, Ferment, Free... Free (RCA, 1969)
 This Is Leon Bibb (RCA, 1970)
 Shenandoah (Leon Bibb Productions, 1997)
 Lift Every Voice And Sing (2003)

Live album

 Encore! (Liberty, 1963)

Collaborative albums

 The Skifflers: Goin' Down To Town (Epic, 1957)
 Leon & Eric Bibb: A Family Affair (Manhaton, 2002)
 Leon & Eric Bibb: Praising Peace: A Tribute To Paul Robeson (Stony Plain, 2006)

References

External links
 
 Illustrated Leon Bibb discography
 

2015 deaths
Members of the Order of British Columbia
American folk singers
Canadian folk singers
1922 births
Musicians from Louisville, Kentucky
Male actors from Louisville, Kentucky
Singers from Kentucky
Simmons College of Kentucky alumni
Folk musicians from Kentucky
20th-century American musicians
21st-century American musicians
American expatriate musicians in Canada